Eglevsky can refer to: 

 André Eglevsky, premier danseur and balletmaster
 Marina Eglevsky, ballerina and daughter to André